Francesca Rochberg (Halton) (born May 8, 1952 in Philadelphia) is an American Assyriologist, historian of science, and Catherine and William L. Magistretti Distinguished Professor of Near Eastern Studies at University of California, Berkeley. She is best known for her work on the history of Babylonian astronomy.

She graduated from the University of Pennsylvania, and the University of Chicago with a Ph.D.  She taught at the University of California, Riverside.

Awards
2010 Research Professorship Ludwig Maximilian University of Munich
2008 Member, American Philosophical Society
2007 Member, Princeton, Institute for Advanced Study, School of Historical Studies
2006 Fellow, Magdalen College, Oxford
2004 Fellow, Center for Ideas and Society, University of California, Riverside
1999 John Frederick Lewis Award for Babylonian Horoscopes (American Philosophical Society, 1998)
1993-94  John Simon Guggenheim Memorial Foundation Fellowship
1982-1987 John D. and Catherine T. MacArthur Fellowship

Works

Before Nature: Cuneiform Knowledge and the History of Science. University of Chicago Press. 2016.

Novels

References

External links
"Francesca Rochberg", Google Scholar

1952 births
Living people
Educators from Philadelphia
American women educators
American Assyriologists
University of Pennsylvania alumni
University of California, Berkeley faculty
MacArthur Fellows
University of Chicago alumni
Members of the American Philosophical Society
Fellows of Magdalen College, Oxford
21st-century American women

Assyriologists